Elections to South Ayrshire Council area were held on 1 May 2003, alongside elections to the Scottish Parliament. All 30 seats were up and this was the final election to the council using First Past the Post. Whilst the Scottish Conservative Party were able to achieve more votes than any other party in the council area, they only received 15 seats - no majority administration was formed with the Scottish Labour Party also holding 15 council seats. Labour continued to run the council after the election following a "cut of the cards" to decide which party would run the administration.

Election result

Ward results

Troon

Prestwick and Monkton

Ayr

Kyle

Carrick

By-election
The North Carrick and Maybole East by-election was called following the resignation of South Ayrshire Labour Party leader Andy Hill on health grounds. In the election Independent candidate Brian Connolly won by a single vote. The loss of the ward for Labour allowed for the Conservatives to take control of the South Ayrshire Council area, governing with a 15-14 majority.

References

2003 Scottish local elections
2003
21st century in South Ayrshire